Meeli is an Estonian feminine given name. The masculine version is Meelis.

People named Meeli include:
Meeli Kõiva (born 1960), artist 
Meeli Sööt (born 1937), actress
Meeli Truu (1946-2013), architect

References

Estonian feminine given names